This is a list of notable events in music that took place in the year 1732.

Events 
January 6 – The Teatro Filarmonico opens in Verona with a performance of Vivaldi's La Fida Ninfa
February 3 – The Opéra-Comique opens in Paris
April 11 – Johann Sebastian Bach revives his St John Passion BWV 245 (BC D 2c) with some textual and instrumentational changes at St. Nicholas Church, Leipzig
April–May – First performances, in London, of George Frideric Handel's Esther as an oratorio
December 7 – The first theatre is built on the site of the Royal Opera House, Covent Garden, London
Between 1732 and 1735 – Bach gives the Leipzig première of Georg Philipp Telemann's Passion oratorio Seliges Erwägen des Leidens und Sterbens Jesu Christi (TWV 5:2)
Michel Corrette begins producing his 25 Concertos Comiques, released until 1773.

Published music 
Michel Blavet – 6 Flute Sonatas, Op. 2
Joseph Bodin de Boismortier 
5 Sonates en trio suivies d'un concerto, Op. 37
2 Sérénades en trois parties, Op. 39
6 Sonates suivies d'un nombre de pièces, Op. 40
Esprit Philippe Chédeville – Recueils de vaudevilles, menuets, contredanses et autres airs choisis pour la musette (Paris)
 Philibert Delavigne – Sonates pour la Musette, Vielle, Flute-a-bec, Traversiere, Hautbois etc. avec la Basse (6 Sonatas), Op. 2 (Paris)
Francesco Geminiani – 6 Concertos, Opp. 3 and 4
George Frideric Handel – Solos for a German Flute a Hoboy or Violin with a Thorough Bass for the Harpsichord or Bass Violin Compos'd by Mr. Handel (London: John Walsh) (second edition: "Note: This is more Corect  than the former Edition")
 Pietro Locatelli – 12 Flute Sonatas, Op. 2
Johann Joachim Quantz – 6 Sonatas for two flutes, Op. 2
Georg Philipp Telemann 
36 Fantaisies pour le clavessin, TWV 33:1-36
Continuation des Sonates Méthodiques, TWV 41

Classical music 
 Giovanni Bononcini – 12 Trio Sonatas
Antonio Caldara
La morte d'Abel
Sedecia
Giovanni Battista Ferrandini – 18 Cantatas, D-Dl Mus.3037-K-1
Lodovico Giustini – 12 Sonate da cimbalo di piano e forte, Op .1
Christoph Graupner 
Trio Sonata in D minor, GWV 207
Flute Concerto in D major, GWV 311
Maurice Greene – The Song of Deborah and Baruk (oratorio)
George Frederic Handel 
Acis and Galatea (revised)
Esther, HWV 50b
Keyboard Sonata in G major, HWV 579
Benedetto Marcello – Six Sonatas for Cello
Giovanni Batisti Pergolesi – Stabat Mater, P. 77
Nicola Antonio Porpora – Il martirio di S. Giovanni Nepomuceno

Opera
Tomaso Albinoni – Ardelinda
Giuseppe Bonno – Nigella e Nise
Antonio Caldara – Adriano in Siria
Geminiano Giacomelli – Alessandro Severo
George Frideric Handel 
Ezio
Sosarme
Johann Adolf Hasse  
Il Demetrio
Euristero
Issipile
John Frederick Lampe – Britannia
Leo Leonardo – Demetrio
Michel Montéclair – Jephté
Giovanni Battista Pergolesi
Lo frate 'nnamorato
La Salustia
Nicola Antonio Porpora – Germanico in Germania
Georg Reutter – Alessandro il Grande
Giovanni Battista Sammartini – Memet
Giuseppe Sellitto – Nitocri
Antonio Vivaldi – La fida ninfa

Publications
Musicalisches Lexicon, compiled by Johann Gottfried Walther
Dissertation sur les différentes méthodes d'accompagnement by Jean-Phillipe Rameau
Essai sur le bon goût en musique – Nicolas Racot de Grandval

Births 
January 2 – František Brixi, composer (died 1771)
January 24 – Pierre Augustin Caron de Beaumarchais
February 18 – Johann Christian Kittel, composer (died 1809)
February 19 – Richard Cumberland, librettist (died 1811)
February 21 – William Falconer, poet (died 1769)
March 31 – Joseph Haydn, composer (died 1809)
May 17 – Francesco Pasquale Ricci, composer (died 1817)
June 7 
Nicolas-Médard Audinot, librettist and actor (died 1801)
Giuseppe Demachi, composer (died 1791)
June 21 – Johann Christoph Friedrich Bach, composer, son of Johann Sebastian Bach (died 1795)
September 1 – Thomas Erskine, 6th Earl of Kellie, composer (died 1781)
October 6 – John Broadwood, founder of firm of piano makers (died 1812) 
Date unknown – Heinrich Ernst Grosmann, composer (died 1811)

Deaths 
January 1 – Nicolo Grimaldi, castrato singer (born 1673)
February 17 – Louis Marchand, composer (born 1669)
March – Joseph François Salomon, composer (born 1649)
July 20 – Francesco Bartolomeo Conti, composer
November 15 – Girolamo Frigimelica Roberti, librettist (born 1653)
December 4 – John Gay, writer of musical theatre (born 1685)
December 14 – Johann Philipp Förtsch, composer (born 1652)
date unknown – Pier Francesco Tosi, castrato singer (born c.1653)

References 

 
18th century in music
Music by year